Children's International Film Festival has been conceptualised by The Film Studio FZ LLC, which is a company based out of Dubai Studio City. Children's International Film Festival, is commonly known as CIFF is the United Arab Emirates' first national level Children's Film Festival. CIFF over a period of time has attracted significant attention from schools, parents, families and filmmakers - locally, regionally and globally.

CIFF has had 4 editions held during the last week of April from the years 2014 to 2017.

Activities
Filmmaking workshops
Filmmaking competition 
Film appreciation forums
International Children Film Screenings

References

External links
 

Film festivals in the United Arab Emirates
Children's film festivals
Spring (season) events in the United Arab Emirates